Chippewa River may refer to:
 Chippewa River (Michigan)
 Chippewa River (Minnesota)
 Chippewa River (Wisconsin)
 Chippewa River (Ontario)